Gary Graham (born 6 August 1982) is a Jamaican cricketer. He played in one List A match for the Jamaican cricket team in 2005, during South Africa's tour of the West Indies. In June 2021, he was selected to take part in the Minor League Cricket tournament in the United States following the players' draft.

See also
 List of Jamaican representative cricketers

References

External links
 

1982 births
Living people
Jamaican cricketers
Jamaica cricketers